The 2016 Virginia Cavaliers men's soccer team will be the college's 76th season of playing organized men's college soccer, and their 63rd season playing in the Atlantic Coast Conference.

Schedule 
''Source:

|-
!colspan=6 style="background:#0d3268; color:#ff7c00;"| Preseason 
|-

|-
!colspan=6 style="background:#0d3268; color:#ff7c00;"| Regular Season
|-

|-
!colspan=6 style="background:#0d3268; color:#ff7c00;"| ACC Tournament
|-

|-
!colspan=6 style="background:#0d3268; color:#ff7c00;"| NCAA Tournament
|-

|-

References 

Virginia Cavaliers
Virginia Cavaliers men's soccer seasons
Virginia Cavaliers men's soccer
Virginia Cavaliers
Virginia Cavaliers